Miss Polonia 2020 was the 43rd Miss Polonia pageant, held on March 8, 2021. The winner was Natalia Gryglewska of Silesia. Gryglewska represented Poland in Miss Grand International 2022 but unplaced. This years pageants was originally slated for November 2020 but was postponed to March 2021 due to the COVID-19 pandemic.

Final results

Special Awards

Jury
The jury (judging panel) consisted of:
Jagoda Piątek-Włodarczyk - Chairwoman
Magda Pieczonka
Agnieszka Kaczorowska-Pela
Katarzyna Cichopek
Marcin Hakiel
Sylwia Romaniuk
Aleksandra Stajszczak
Tomasz Ciachorowski
Mariusz Kałamaga
Agata Biernat - Miss Polonia 2017

Finalists

Notes

Withdrawals
 Lower Silesia
 Podlasie
 Warmia-Masuria
 Polish Community in Lithuania

Returns
Last competed in 2006:
 Polish Community in Germany

Last competed in 2018:
 Pomerania

Did not compete
 Holy Cross
 Lower Poland
 Lubusz
 Opole
 Subcarpathia
 Polish Community in Argentina
 Polish Community in Australia
 Polish Community in Belarus
 Polish Community in Brazil
 Polish Community in Canada
 Polish Community in Czechia
 Polish Community in France
 Polish Community in Ireland
 Polish Community in Israel
 Polish Community in Kazakhstan
 Polish Community in Russia
 Polish Community in Slovakia
 Polish Community in South Africa
 Polish Community in Sweden
 Polish Community in Ukraine
 Polish Community in the U.K.
 Polish Community in the U.S.
 Polish Community in Venezuela

References

External links
Official Website

2020
2021 beauty pageants
2021 in Poland
Events postponed due to the COVID-19 pandemic